Vadim Anatolyevich Devyatovskiy (Łacinka: Vadzim Anatolevič Dzieviatoŭski, ; born 20 March 1977 in Navapołacak, Belarusian SSR, USSR) is a Belarusian hammer thrower.

He finished fourth at the 2004 Summer Olympics, and in 2005 he won the World Championships after his countryman Ivan Tsikhan was stripped of his gold medal because of doping violations. In July the same year he threw 84.90 metres, which currently is his personal best. He originally won a silver medal at the 2008 Summer Olympics, but was later taken away for doping, but reinstated afterwards.

Since 2008 he is a coach of Estonian hammer thrower Ellina Anissimova.

On 21 August 2020, during the 2020–21 Belarusian protests against the government of Alexander Lukashenko, Devyatovskiy posted a message on his Facebook page in which he stated that "Lukashenko is not my President!!!!!" and stated that his previous support for the regime was a "delusion" and "betrayal of myself".

Doping allegations
He was suspended from the sport for doping violations from 18 September 2000 to 17 September 2002.

On 4 September 2008 it was reported that Devyatovskiy and the bronze medalist from the Olympics, fellow Belarusian Ivan Tsikhan, were under investigation by the International Olympic Committee for doping offenses. In December 2008, the IOC found him guilty of doping and took away his medal. He appealed the IOC's findings to the Court of Arbitration for Sport.

In June 2010 CAS ruled that the Beijing National Laboratory, which carried out the tests, had violated "documentation and reporting requirements" and granted his appeal for the reinstatement of the original competition results and the metal to be returned. It said the decision "should not be interpreted as an exoneration of the athletes," and the court did not say the athletes are free of any doping suspicion. CAS said the lab had provided no "plausible explanation" for interruption of the automated testing procedure of the IRMS—isotope ratio mass spectrometry—instruments and the lab breached international standards by having the same analyst test both the "A" and "B" samples. CAS further elaborated that the departure from these international standards "justify the annulment of the tests' results for both athletes".

Achievements

References

External links

1977 births
Living people
Belarusian male hammer throwers
Athletes (track and field) at the 2004 Summer Olympics
Athletes (track and field) at the 2008 Summer Olympics
Olympic athletes of Belarus
Doping cases in athletics
Belarusian sportspeople in doping cases
World Athletics Championships medalists
European Athletics Championships medalists
Medalists at the 2008 Summer Olympics
Medalists at the 2004 Summer Olympics
People from Navapolatsk
Olympic silver medalists for Belarus
Olympic silver medalists in athletics (track and field)
Universiade medalists in athletics (track and field)
Universiade gold medalists for Belarus
World Athletics Championships winners
Medalists at the 2005 Summer Universiade
Sportspeople from Vitebsk Region